George J. Kern (1850–1918) was a member of the Wisconsin State Assembly.

Biography
Kern was born on April 6, 1850, in Herman, Dodge County, Wisconsin. In 1868, he moved to Sullivan, Wisconsin.

Career
Kern was elected to the Assembly in 1900 and was re-elected in 1902. Additionally, he served as Assessor and Supervisor of Sullivan and a member of the Jefferson County, Wisconsin Board. He was Democrat.

References

External links
The Political Graveyard

1850 births
1918 deaths
People from Herman, Dodge County, Wisconsin
People from Sullivan, Wisconsin
Democratic Party members of the Wisconsin State Assembly